German submarine U-129 was a Type IXC U-boat of Nazi Germany's Kriegsmarine during World War II. She was laid down at the AG Weser yard, Bremen as yard number 992 on 30 July 1940, launched on 28 February 1941 and was commissioned  on 21 May with Kapitänleutnant Nicolai Clausen in command.

Her service life began with training in the 4th U-boat Flotilla; she moved to the 2nd Flotilla for operations on 1 July 1941.

Design
German Type IXC submarines were slightly larger than the original Type IXBs. U-129 had a displacement of  when at the surface and  while submerged. She had two shafts and two  propellers.

U-129 was fitted with six  torpedo tubes (four fitted at the bow and two at the stern), 22 torpedoes, one  SK C/32 naval gun, 180 rounds, and a  SK C/30 as well as a  C/30 anti-aircraft gun. The boat had a complement of forty-eight.

Service history

She made the short journey from Kiel, arriving in Horten Naval Base in Norway on 24 July 1941.

First, second and third patrols
The boat's first patrol involved her departure from Horten, crossing the North Sea and entering the Atlantic Ocean by passing close to the Faroe Islands on the Icelandic side. She arrived at Lorient (where she would be based for most of her career), in occupied France on 30 August 1941.

Her second sortie saw her cross the Bay of Biscay to a point north of the Azores.

Her third patrol was further south, as far south as a similar latitude to Rio de Janeiro, but success continued to elude her.

Fourth patrol
Things improved dramatically when as part of Operation Drumbeat, she attacked Nordvangen on 20 February; this ship sank in one minute northeast of Trinidad. Staying in the West Indies / northern South America region, she sank another six vessels.

1926 D/S Cadmus (UKJ101192601) Torpedoed and sunk 01/07 by the German submarine U 129 (Kapitänleutnant Hans Ludwig Witt) in position 22.50N-92.30W while on a voyage from Tela, Honduras to Galveston, TX, USA with bananas. Two men lost. Captain Alfred Stenersen and the survivors abandoned into 2 life boats. They landed 06/07 about 60 nm south of Texpan, Mexico.

1927 MS GUNDERSEN (UKJ101192702) Departed Tela, Honduras 29/06 with 16.255 banana stems for Galveston, TX, USA. Torpedoed 01/07 by the German submarine U-129 (Kapitänleutnant Hans-Ludwig Witt) in position 23.33N-92.35V in the Gulf of Mexico. 22 were saved by Norwegian SS DEA, but an English messboy died, probably during the explosion. GUNDERSEN caught fire and sank within the next 45 minutes.

Fifth and sixth patrols
The submarine returned to her sunshine haunts; included in the toll was Hardwicke Grange, which was sunk with torpedoes and the deck gun north of Puerto Rico on 12 June 1942. She also sank Millinocket on 17 June off La Isabela, Cuba and a ship from the Soviet Union, Tuapse, in the Gulf of Mexico on 4 July.

Seventh, eighth and ninth patrols
On the return journey U129 was refuelling from the 'milk cow' supply submarine  when two men were swept overboard. One was recovered fairly swiftly but the other could not be found.
Her eighth patrol was west of the Canary Islands and produced no results.

U-129s ninth patrol was divided into two; she departed Lorient on 9 October 1943, but put into Saint-Nazaire on the 11th. A day later she headed for the US east coast, sinking Libertad on 4 December off North Carolina.

Tenth patrol
The boat began her last operation which at 111 days, was her longest, on 22 March 1944.

Fate
The boat was taken out of service at Lorient 4 July 1944; she was scuttled on 18 August. She was raised and broken up in 1946.

Summary of raiding history

References

Bibliography

External links

World War II submarines of Germany
1941 ships
Ships built in Bremen (state)
German Type IX submarines
U-boats commissioned in 1941
Maritime incidents in August 1944